Viceroy of the Deccan was the representative of the Mughal emperors in Deccan, Deccan consisted of six Mughal governorates (Subah): Khandesh, Bijapur, Berar, Aurangabad, Hyderabad and Bidar. Carnatic region was sub-Subah administered partly by governor of Bijapur and Hyderabad.

The domain of Viceroy of the Deccan extends from the Narmada river in the North to Trichinopoly in the South and Masulipatnam in the east to Bijapur in the west. The Aurangabad city was selected as the viceregal capital of Deccan where Aurangzeb resided until his death in 1707 AD, and the Asaf Jah I ruled from the very place until 1750 AD, when his capital was shifted to Hyderabad city and the domain of Viceroy of Deccan was renamed as Hyderabad Deccan.

History

In 1636 Shah Jahan appointed Aurangzeb as the Viceroy of the Deccan.

Further reading
The Mughal Empire and the Deccan-Economic factors and consequences, by Shireen Moosvi-(1982), Published by: Indian History Congress, as Proceedings of the Indian History Congress-Volume 43 (1982)

References

Government of the Mughal Empire
Deccan sultanates
Nizams of Hyderabad